Sir William Marston Logan, KBE, CMG (10 March 1889 – 30 September 1968) was a British colonial administrator. He was Governor of Seychelles from 1942 to 1947.

The son of the Rev. James Moffat Logan, Logan was educated in Bristol and at Brasenose College, Oxford. After joining the Colonial Administrative Service as a District Officer in Kenya in 1913.

References 

 Logan, Sir William Marston, (10 March 1889–30 Sept. 1968)
 Island history: 18 British governors who led Seychelles through the 20th century
 THE COLONIAL GOVERNORS OF SEYCHELLES – (1903 – 1976) | Ministry of Youth Sports & Culture

Colonial Administrative Service officers
1889 births
1968 deaths